Eduard Sperling (29 November 1902 in Hamm – 24 February 1985 in Dortmund) was a German wrestler who competed in the 1928 Summer Olympics and in the 1932 Summer Olympics.

References

External links
 

1902 births
1985 deaths
Olympic wrestlers of Germany
Wrestlers at the 1928 Summer Olympics
Wrestlers at the 1932 Summer Olympics
German male sport wrestlers
Olympic silver medalists for Germany
Olympic bronze medalists for Germany
Olympic medalists in wrestling
Medalists at the 1932 Summer Olympics
Medalists at the 1928 Summer Olympics
Sportspeople from Hamm
20th-century German people